Expedition 68 is the 68th long-duration expedition to the International Space Station. The expedition began upon the departure of Soyuz MS-21 on 29 September 2022, with ESA astronaut Samantha Cristoforetti taking over as ISS commander, and will end upon the departure of the unmanned Soyuz MS-22 spacecraft in March 2023. Initially, the expedition consisted of Cristoforetti and her three SpaceX Crew-4 crewmates Kjell N. Lindgren, Bob Hines and Jessica Watkins, as well as Roscosmos cosmonauts Sergey Prokopyev, Dmitry Petelin and American astronaut, Francisco Rubio, who launched aboard Soyuz MS-22 on September 21, 2022 and were transferred from Expedition 67 alongside the Crew-4 astronauts.

Crew-4 departed the station on 13 October 2022 (splashing down the next day) and was replaced by SpaceX Crew-5 through a direct handover, which ferried NASA astronauts Nicole Mann and Josh Cassada, as well as JAXA astronaut Koichi Wakata and Roscosmos cosmonaut Anna Kikina, to the station. Before departing, Cristoforetti handed command of the station over to Prokopyev.

On December 14, 2022, a coolant leak was discovered on the docked Soyuz MS-22 vehicle causing it to leak ammonia, which forced the cancellation of an imminent Russian spacewalk.

After observation and imaging of the damaged spacecraft, in January 2023, Roscosmos and NASA announced that due to the leak, the MS-22 vehicle could not safely return the crew, except in an emergency. The governing bodies also announced changes to the crew manifest: the Soyuz MS-22 crew will remain on the station for 12 months and the Soyuz MS-22 craft will return unmanned. The Soyuz MS-23 craft will launch unmanned in February, and the Soyuz crew will return to Earth in August or September on MS-23. The original MS-23 crew will instead launch on Soyuz MS-24, working on the station for both Expedition 68 and 69, with a chance at crossing over to Expedition 70, pending official scheduling details. Rubio's seat liner was shifted to Crew 5 and ultimately all Soyuz MS-22 seat liners were shifted to Soyuz MS-23 as seat liner are specifically designed to seat the cosmonaut seat in it.

In February, on the day of docking for the Progress MS-22/83P vehicle, another Russian craft Progress MS-21/82P, experienced a coolant leak, the second to occur on station in just two months. Due to this, Russian officials on the ground had postponed the unmanned launch of the Soyuz MS-23 until an investigation was conducted or a cause was found.  Days after the leak, it was determined safe to launch Soyuz MS-23, being launched on February 24. Roscosmos conducted a thermal test of MS-22 which lost coolant agent in the external contour due to the damage of the radiator.

In an unrelated change to the US crew manifest, SpaceX's Crew-6 mission launched on 2 March 2023, as opposed to the usual launch date of April/September. Traditionally, Expeditions end with the departure of a Soyuz. This continues with Expedition 68, albeit without crew on board. All onboard crew will transfer to Expedition 69 with the departure of Soyuz MS-22 on 28 March.

Events manifest 
Previously: Expedition 67

29 September 2022 - Soyuz MS-21 Departure; Official switch from Expedition 67

6 October 2022 - SpaceX Crew-5 Docking 

14 October 2022 - SpaceX Crew-4 Undocking

9 November 2022 - CRS Cygnus NG-18 Capture

23 October 2022 - Progress MS-19/80P Undocking

27 October 2022 - Progress MS-21/82P Docking

15 November 2022 - EVA 1 (US-81) 7 hr, 11 mins

17 November 2022 - EVA 2 (RUS) 6 hr, 25 mins

27 November 2022 - CRS SpX-26 Docking

3 December 2022 - EVA 3 (US-82) 7 hr, 5 mins

14 December 2022 - Soyuz MS-22 Leak Event, cancelled Russian EVA

22 December 2022 - EVA 4 (US-83) 7 hr, 8 mins

9 January 2023 - CRS SpX-26 Undocking

17/18 January 2023 - Rubio's seat liner moved from Soyuz MS-22 to Crew-5

20 January 2023 - EVA 5 (US-84) 7 hr, 21 mins

2 February 2023 - EVA 6 (US-85) 6 hr, 41 mins

11 February 2023 - Progress MS-22/83P Docking

11 February 2023 - Progress MS-21 Leak Event

18 February 2023 - Progress MS-21/82P Undocking

26 February 2023 - Soyuz MS-23 Unmanned Docking

2 March 2023 - Prokopyev and Petelin's seat liner moved from Soyuz MS-22 to Soyuz MS-23

3 March 2023 - SpaceX Crew-6 Docking

6 March 2023 - Rubio's seat liner moved from Crew-5 to Soyuz MS-23

11 March 2023 - SpaceX Crew-5 Undocking

15 March 2023 - Thermal test of Soyuz MS-22 by onboard cosmonauts to check how much it will heat up and whether it can be used for emergency evacuation from the ISS in case of any incident.

16 March 2023 - CRS SpX-27 Docking

Planned Events:

28 March 2023 - Soyuz MS-22 Unmanned Undocking; end of Expedition

Will Transfer to: Expedition 69

Crew

Samantha Cristoforetti's mission for ESA on Expeditions 67 and 68 was named Minerva.

Anna Kikina's ride to the station on Crew-5 marked the first time in NASA's Commercial Crew Program that a Russian cosmonaut flew on Dragon, and the first time a Russian (flying for Russia)  flew on a US spacecraft in 20 years. 

Koichi Wakata's flight to the ISS was his fifth, and his first on Dragon. Combined with his previous flights on Soyuz and the Space Shuttle, he becomes the eighth person to fly on three different Earth-launching spacecraft.

Vehicle manifest

Notes

References 

Expeditions to the International Space Station
2022 in spaceflight
2023 in spaceflight